El Viñedo is a neighborhood in northern Valencia, Venezuela. It is home to many of the city's best restaurants and nightclubs; this area is known as "La calle de los cafés" (Café Street). El Viñedo is home to many of Valencia's best hotels: the new Embassy Suites hotel is in El Viñedo and is widely regarded as one of Valencia's best; additionally the Ucaima Hotel is located in El Viñedo. Valencia's Avenida Bolivar borders El Viñedo and once the situation with the city's metro is solved the area will become easier to access from other zones of Valencia.

See also
 List of restaurant districts and streets

Entertainment districts
Restaurant districts and streets